Piątkowa may refer to the following places:
Piątkowa, Lesser Poland Voivodeship (south Poland)
Piątkowa, Przemyśl County in Subcarpathian Voivodeship (south-east Poland)
Piątkowa, Rzeszów County in Subcarpathian Voivodeship (south-east Poland)